Monis is a surname of the following people:

 Ernest Monis (1846–1929), French politician
 Hank Monis (1923–2011), Canadian musician
 Judah Monis (1683–1784), North America's first college instructor of Hebrew language
 Man Haron Monis (1964–2014) Iranian-Australian Islamic extremist

Other meanings:
 Moni people, indigenous people of Western New Guinea